Wiktor Grodecki (born 25 February 1960 in Warsaw) is a Polish film director, screenwriter and producer known for Mandragora (five main prizes at Geneva "Stars Of Tomorrow" film festival in Switzerland in 1997 and Audience Choice Award at Palm Springs Intl Film Fest, USA 1998 as well as Insatiability - an adaptation of the novel by Witkacy which was awarded Best Indie Director prize by SAG in USA in 2004.

Biography
Grodecki studied with the film direction faculty in the National Film School in Łódź under the supervision of Wojciech Jerzy Has. The first step of his international career was directing the 1985 movie Him, which was produced by the University of Minnesota Film Society in collaboration with producer Albert Milgrom.

In 1994 he made a documentary film about male child prostitution in the Czech republic, Not Angels But Angels, followed by another one on the same theme, Body Without Soul. The two documentaries feature graphic, sexually explicit footage of underage minors and the dissection of a corpse shot on location in Prague.

In 1997, he made Mandragora, which is a dramatic story about a young man exploring the world of prostitution, drugs and AIDS. The film won many awards and was seen by Václav Havel, who wrote a letter to congratulate Grodecki personally. The letter from Havel praising Grodecki was published by the Czech newspaper Mlada Fronta Dnes.

In 2004 Grodecki filmed Insatiability based on the novel by St.I.Witkiewicz (Witkacy). The film starred Cezary Pazura in three different roles (Zypcio's Father, his seducer Tengier and his commander Kocmoluchowicz). Insatiability premiered at the Berlin International Film Festival in 2004 (in the official section: Panorama Special), where it received excellent reviews. In Los Angeles, the Screen Actors Guild of America awarded Grodecki the SAG Best Indie Director Award for Insatiability (2004).

Filmography

Screenwriter
 1984: Him
 1994: Not Angels But Angels
 1996: Body Without Soul
 1997: Mandragora
 2000: Inferno
 2003: Nienasycenie
 2011: The Soul of the Murdered Kingdom 
 2012: Forefathers' Eve
 2013: Beefcake

Director
 1981: Nie brooklinski most
 1981: Portret artysty z czasów młodości
 1981: Już tylko tyle
 1982: Nagi przyszedlem
 1984: Him
 1994: Not Angels But Angels
 1996: Body Without Soul
 1997: Mandragora
 1999: Ich wünsch Dir Liebe
 2000: Inferno
 2003-2005: Czego się boją faceci, czyli seks w mniejszym mieście, Season 1, Episodes 4-13
 2003: Nienasycenie
 2011: The Soul of the Murdered Kingdom (Pre-Production)

Editor
 1994: Nocny pociąg do Wenecji
 1997: Mandragora
 2000: Inferno

See also
Cinema of Poland
List of Polish language films

Notes

External links
 
 Trailers for some of his films

Film people from Warsaw
Polish film directors
Polish screenwriters
1960 births
Living people